Flaunt was a British electronic dance music TV channel owned and operated by the CSC Media Group. It played music videos from the dance, techno, trance, disco, eurodance, house & upbeat pop genres 24/7.

History

Early History (2003-2004)
In March 2003, British Sky Broadcasting announced they would enter the music television market and launch three themed channels - Flaunt, Scuzz, and The Amp.

Flaunt would launch with its sister networks on April 17, 2003. For its launch, Flaunt focused on the pop and dance genres, with a female-oriented appeal for the first year of its existence, with a pink logo and a gray/white graphic scheme. The channel also aired entertainment programming from Red Carpet Bitch with British TV Presenter Julian Bennett that focused on celebrity gossip.

Following the channel's launch, Sky signed a deal with Channel 5 for Flaunt to become the new sponsor for the weekly Chart Show in June 2003. Flaunt also had first-time exclusive rights to air Popworld before Channel 4 aired it on their main channel which is a show made by Channel 4.

In September 2004, due to poor viewing figures and ratings, Sky announced that Chart Show Channels would take over operating Flaunt, Scuzz and The Amp beginning in January 2005, although they would retain full ownership in all three channels, alongside advertising control.

First Relaunch (2004-2006)
In October 2004, Flaunt received its first relaunch, gaining a new logo and a blue, circular graphics scheme. It had a parrot mascot during this period where he appeared in many of its idents. The idents were produced by Mark Chandler.

Relaunch as gay-oriented network (2006-2007)
In July 2006, Flaunt relaunched as a gay oriented music channel; it focused mostly on the Gay icons like Kylie Minogue, Madonna, Cher and Cyndi Lauper. Around the time of the channel relaunch it coincided with Euro-Pride as a celebration. The channel had also undergone a new logo along with song title graphics which was a banner with twinkling stars in the bottom left side of the screen in 4:3 safe area. The channel idents around this time consisted of mostly shirtless men at the gym and disco ball shadow.

Sky announced in November 2006 that their music channels would go Free-To-Air beginning on December 11, 2006, and soon afterwards transitioned full ownership to Chart Show Channels in December 2006, previously, Flaunt alongside its sister music channels were encrypted in NDS from its launch, and broadcasting on the Eutelsat 28A communications satellite meant that the channels could be viewed for the first time all across parts of Europe.

Relaunch as a dance-focused channel (2007-2008)
Around this time shortly after going Free-To-Air, Flaunt had axed its gay theming entirely around this period and reformatted itself towards dance music instead of focusing on the niche gay audience and prior to the reformat the channel previously had a dance music appeal prior before turning exclusively into an All-Dance music channel before 2007 rebrand.

In March 2007, Flaunt received a major overhaul to its playlist, both the channel's presentation design were changed to match the new audience reach towards catering for the dance music market. Flaunt had gradually delved further into various different sub genres of dance music such as trance, techno, house, electronica, ambient, and trip hop music. However, around this period Flaunt did not change its presentation that much during this period, however they did abandon the baby blue and pink glitter graphics along with disco ball logo in favour of a purple and blue logo and swish effect graphics. During this period Flaunt had gained quick popularity in the dance music scene playing a wide range of popular dance hits to dance classics, and to lesser-known obscure songs. Flaunt also had special events in Ibiza in their Flaunt Sessions show hosted by singer/songwriter Chantal Matar. Superstar DJ's Ferry Corsten, Paul van Dyk, and Tiesto presented Flaunt at Creamfields. Dance acts Infernal, September, Chicane, and Freemasons were also guests at Flaunt Sessions where they presented their favourite dance songs, and presented their own songs. DJ and radio host Pete Tong was also a guest to present several shows on the Flaunt during the WMC specials. Flaunt started to become highly respected within the British dance music community throughout this era. The channel was mostly house, and euro music oriented by playing artists from the likes of Freemasons, Axwell, Stonebridge, Solu Music, The Shapeshifters, Kate Ryan, and Jessy De Smet.

On November 6, 2007, Flaunt and its sister channels were removed from the ex-NTL Virgin Media areas following a failure of an agreement from Chart Show Channels for the networks to be made available in the ex-Telewest areas, alongside Virgin Media wanting to focus more on their Free On-Demand services.

Relaunch as a thematic network and Closure (2008-2010)
In May 2008, Flaunt was rebranded with yet another new logo along with a new graphics set. This time they adopted a retro type font with a white logo and the graphics presentation were graphic equalisers. This period Flaunt begun to experiment with more thematic shows and became more trance-oriented during the late nights by playing videos from the likes of Solarstone, iiO, The Thrillseekers, Armin van Buuren, Above & Beyond, Richard Durand, Filo & Peri, Paul Oakenfold, DT8 Project, Ferry Corsten, and ATB.

On May 6, 2008, CSC Media Group launched a one-hour timeshift channel called Flaunt +1. It was available 24 hours a day on Sky 367. However, after nearly 4 weeks on air, Flaunt +1 was replaced with Pop Girl +1 on June 4, 2008.

After almost 7 years on air, Flaunt was closed down on March 17, 2010, and was replaced with Dance Nation TV.

Former programming

Flaunt Anthems
Party Hard
Get Up Flaunt It!
Flaunt Classics 
100% Dance
Non Stop Party!
Total Trance
Nothing But...
Weekender
Flaunt Lounge
Flaunt Party
Twice as Nice
Fresh 'n' Wild

Ofcom licences mix-up/Flava TV channel
The problems started on Monday February 18, 2008, when the currently named "Flava" Ofcom Licence was renamed from its original name of Flaunt to Flava. This caused a major uproar about the fact that Flaunt, a 24/7 dance channel would be closed, in favour of Flava (a 24/7 Hip Hop/Urban/R&B music channel, similar to Kiss, MTV Base, Channel U, and B4). This however turned out to be an error on Ofcom's part, and they accidentally changed Flaunt when they were meant to change the B4 one. But on the following Monday, Ofcom corrected the problem by removing the B4 licence, keeping the newly renamed Flava licence, and adding a new Flaunt licence.

Virgin Media removal
On November 6, 2007, Flaunt along with Bliss, and Scuzz were removed from Virgin Media's ex-NTL platform as a deal with Chart Show Channels could not be made to make the channels available to their ex-Telewest platform.

References

External links
Flaunt's Official Website
Ofcom License for Flaunt, permitting name change

External links
Ofcom License for Flaunt, permitting name change

CSC Media Group
Defunct television channels in the United Kingdom
Dance music television channels
Television channels and stations established in 2003
Television channels and stations disestablished in 2010
Music video networks in the United Kingdom